Hōjō Ujinao (北条 氏直: 1562 – December 19, 1591) was a Japanese daimyō of the late Sengoku period, and the final head of the Later Hōjō clan. An important figure in the history of Azuchi-Momoyama politics, he lost his entire domain following the Siege of Odawara (1590). Despite this, he survived, and his family carried on as small daimyo in the Edo period.

Biography
Born in Odawara Castle in 1562, Ujinao was the grandson of Hōjō Ujiyasu and son of Hōjō Ujimasa and was first named Kuniōmaru (国王丸). His mother was the daughter of Takeda Shingen. 

Coming of age in early 1577, he took the formal name Ujinao. Ujinao married Tokuhime, the second daughter of Tokugawa Ieyasu, as a condition for peace between their two clans. In maturity, Ujinao held junior 5th court rank, lower grade (ju-go-i-ge) and the title Sakyō-dayu. Later, he took part Ujimasa invasion at Kazusa Province. This battle marked the first battle for Ujinao.

In 1582, after the death of Oda Nobunaga, He and the Hōjō family took the advantage of the situation to launch a certain attack against Nobunaga's senior retainer, Takigawa Kazumasu at Battle of Kanagawa.

In 1590, Odawara fell to siege at the hands of Toyotomi Hideyoshi; his father and uncle were forced to commit suicide, but Ujinao was spared because he was Tokugawa Ieyasu's son-in-law. Ujinao and his wife were exiled to Mount Kōya, where he died late the following year.

His adoptive son, Hōjō Ujimori, was the first daimyo of Sayama-han (Kawachi Province, 10,000 koku).

Family
 Father: Hojo Ujimasa
 Mother: Obaiin (1543-1569)
 Wife: Toku Hime
 Children:
 Son by Tokuhime
 Hoshuin-dono married Ikeda Toshitaka by Tokuhime
 Manshuin-dono by Tokuhime

Go-Hōjō clan
Samurai
Daimyo
1562 births
1591 deaths
People from Odawara